The Foreigner is a fictional supervillain appearing in American comic books published by Marvel Comics. He was formerly married to Silver Sable.  He was created by writer Peter David, and first appeared in Web of Spider-Man #15 (June 1986).

The Foreigner is a mercenary and assassin. Although he has no superhuman abilities, he has trained his body to be in absolute peak physical condition, is among the greatest martial arts practitioners in the Marvel Universe, and as a professional assassin, who has evaded detection by various international law enforcement agencies, is highly intelligent. He is often depicted as being exceedingly competent.

Publication history
Writer Peter David created the Foreigner as a master assassin character to be a nemesis for Spider-Man. According to David, the character was designed to bear a strong resemblance to Patrick McGoohan. The character's voice was first heard on a telephone in a scene in Web of Spider-Man #15 (June 1986), which was written by David Michelinie, but he did not make a full, visual appearance until later that year in The Spectacular Spider-Man #116 (July 1986).

The Foreigner was favored by editor Jim Owsley as the Hobgoblin's true identity.

Fictional character biography
The Foreigner first appeared as a foe of Spider-Man when making a wager with another villain, Chance, that the latter could not defeat and kill Spider-Man. The Foreigner won this wager. In an attempt to impress the Foreigner, the assassin Sabretooth volunteered to kill the thief known as the Black Cat who had stolen a solid gold notebook from the Foreigner's office. However, Spider-Man intervened and defeated Sabretooth. Eventually, he defeated the Black Cat himself and then decided, instead of executing, to start a romantic relationship to use under the pretense of forming an alliance in order to destroy Spider-Man (all the while the true ulterior motive being to enlist the membership of Spider-Man as an assassin in his 1400 Club). Spider-Man turned him down and the Foreigner was forced to abandon that identity.

The Foreigner hired an assassin to assume the identity of Blaze to fire-bomb the Black Cat's apartment. Disguised as Lieutenant Kris Keating, the Foreigner killed Blaze and framed Spider-Man for the job. As Keating, the Foreigner escaped an assassination attempt by the Rose. He finally battled Spider-Man for the first time, and was betrayed by the Black Cat. The Foreigner hired the Hobgoblin to steal an incriminating ledger from the Kingpin. The Foreigner was defeated by Silver Sable in a fencing duel. Blood Rose hired the Foreigner, who in turn hired the Hunters and the New Enforcers to bring down the remnants of the Kingpin's empire.

In the past, he has started a club of assassins called the 1400 Club. The CIA, FBI, and most government agencies throughout the world are not aware of the Foreigner's existence or that of his organization. As a master of disguise, he has literally hundreds of identities all over the world. These identities are used not only by him, but by other members of his organization who are also masters of disguise and assassination.

He was formerly married to Silver Sable, and was romantically involved for a short time with the Black Cat. He is a friend of Wilson Fisk and it is rumored that the two were friends when the Foreigner was hired to kill Fisk by one of his enemies but the Foreigner discovered they had the same birthday and capriciously decided to kill his employer instead. Later, he met Fisk and initiated their friendship/business relationship.

The Foreigner was once hired to kill the Hobgoblin by the mercenary Jason Macendale (who later himself became the Hobgoblin). He carried out the execution of Ned Leeds. The Foreigner's men made quick work and slit Leeds's throat. It was later revealed that Leeds was actually a puppet of the original Hobgoblin who had abandoned the persona to avoid such an assassination. Later he hired Whisper, Pulse, Swift, and Warfare to kill Betty Brant Leeds, who was seeking to expose the Foreigner's role in Ned's death. He revealed to Betty that Leeds was supposedly the original Hobgoblin.

At some time in the past, the Foreigner trained the superhuman mutant known as Sabretooth. He has since distanced himself from his former novice. It seems the Foreigner shuns Sabretooth's murderous nature, at least in so much that Sabretooth even kills people when it is not profitable, which the Foreigner considers bad business practice.

He has been hired by many different characters to carry out various assassinations. He has never been incarcerated or positively identified by authorities. The few cases in which he did not carry out his objectives tended to be due to his personal whimsy and not his inability. The Foreigner's real name and origin have yet to be revealed and although he speaks with a British accent, he may not be British.

At one point, machinations by Justin Hammer turned the 1400 Club against him and the organization was destroyed; the Foreigner did not seem to intend to rebuild it, as he realized the whole thing was too unwieldy and bloated for his tastes.

It was discovered that Foreigner is the one responsible for murdering Thunderbolt Ross, and framing Captain America for the crime. A somehow revived and rejuvenated Peggy Carter, operating as Dryad, takes down Foreigner's New York-based safe houses. Peggy confronts Foreigner and fights him until Crossbones and Sin shoot a missile at them. Peggy survives the attack, while Foreigner presumably perishes.

Foreigner visited Chance's airborne casino called the Palace where he got swindled by Chance. Foreigner is tricked and pressured by Chance into covering the night's debts if he can steal Spider-Man's web-shooters. Both of them succeeded with help from the Jack O'Lanterns. Then Chance had to reluctantly agree to become Foreigner's business partner.

After Foreigner and Chance found out that Empire State University student Jamie Tolentino used the Clairvoyant to win all bets and racked up a debt when it ran out of battery power, they were told by Jamie that he can get him the Catalyst as a power source for the Clairvoyant. They succeed despite the intervention of Spider-Man and both devices are now in the Palace. It is then revealed that the Jack O'Lanterns, Grizzly, and many of the Palace's patrons are actually sleeper agents of Finisher and Chameleon as they start to trash the Palace. Foreigner and Chance persuaded Slyde to work for them with a doubled pay while Jack O'Lantern fought the Jack O'Lanterns. Spider-Man and Jamie were able to prevent the Palace from crashing into Manhattan. Afterwards with his bank accounts drained by Spider-Man and Ned Leeds, Foreigner hires Taskmaster and Black Ant to assist in his payback plot.

During the Sinister War storyline, Foreigner, Taskmaster, Black Ant, Chance, Jack O'Lantern, and Slyde are sent by Kindred to attack Spider-Man after Kindred had disrupted their armored car robbery.

Powers and abilities
The Foreigner has no superhuman abilities. However, he has trained his body to be in peak physical condition. He is stronger, faster, more agile, and has better reaction time than any Olympic athlete. He is adept in all known forms of martial arts, and most forms of conventional hand weaponry. He is among the greatest pugilists in the Marvel Universe, similar in ability to Captain America and Wolverine. His skills are such that even without superhuman abilities, he is able to pull off seemingly inhuman feats of strength through intense concentration, and has even battled Spider-Man to a stand still.

He possesses a near-mystic ability to place an opponent in a 10-second hypnotic trance through eye-contact, which makes the opponent believe the Foreigner can move faster than the eye can see. He has hypnotized Spider-Man in this fashion, which left Spider-Man disoriented or in a light trance for a few seconds while the Foreigner ran away at what seemed to be nearly superhuman speed; from Spider-Man's perspective it appeared that the Foreigner had teleported away. The Foreigner uses this ability for evading enemies.

He is a master of disguise and has assumed various identities all over the world. He is a brilliant strategist, tactician, and intelligence gatherer who has somehow escaped much notice from governments and their agencies, leaving it to Spider-Man and other superheroes to handle him.

References

External links

Characters created by Peter David
Comics characters introduced in 1986
Fictional assassins in comics
Fictional mercenaries in comics
Marvel Comics male supervillains
Marvel Comics martial artists
Spider-Man characters